Clean Hands Go Foul is the fourth and final album by American drone metal band Khanate. It was released in May 2009 on Hydra Head Records.

Track listing

Personnel 
 Alan Dubin – vocals
 Stephen O'Malley – guitars
 James Plotkin – bass
 Tim Wyskida – drums

References 

2009 albums
Hydra Head Records albums
Khanate (band) albums
Albums produced by James Plotkin